Black Dragons is a 1942 American film directed by William Nigh and starring Bela Lugosi, Joan Barclay, and George Pembroke. The cast includes Clayton Moore, who plays a handsome detective. The Black Dragon Society also appears in Let's Get Tough! a 1942 East Side Kids film made by the same team of writer Harvey Gates and producer Sam Katzman.

Plot 
It is prior to the American entry into World War II, and Japan's fiendish Black Dragon Society is hatching an evil plot with the Nazis. They instruct a brilliant scientist, Dr. Melcher, to travel to Japan on a secret mission. There he operates on six Japanese conspirators, transforming them to resemble six American leaders. The actual leaders are murdered and replaced with their likenesses. Dr. Melcher is condemned to a lifetime of imprisonment so the secret may die with him.

Cast
Bela Lugosi as Dr. Melcher aka Monsieur Colomb / Cell Prisoner
Joan Barclay as Alice Saunders
George Pembroke as Dr. Bill Saunders
Clayton Moore as Dick Martin
Robert Frazer as Amos Hanlin
Edward Peil, Sr. as Philip Wallace (credited as Edward Piel Sr.)
Robert Fiske as Ryder
Irving Mitchell as John Van Dyke
Kenneth Harlan as FBI Chief Colton
Max Hoffman Jr. as Kearney
Frank Melton as FBI Agent
Joseph Eggenton as Stevens
I. Stanford Jolley as The Dragon (credited as Stanford Jolley)
Jack Cheatham as Policeman (uncredited)
Jack Chefe as Hotel Clerk (uncredited)
Bernard Gorcey as The Cabbie (uncredited)
Jack Holmes as Industrialist (uncredited)
Ethelreda Leopold as Girl at Party (uncredited)
Carl M. Leviness as Industrialist (uncredited)

Production
The film was rushed into production following the attack on Pearl Harbor. It was to begin filming on 17 January 1942 but this was pushed back until 21 January. The original working title was The Yellow Menace.

Release
The film was released in Los Angeles on the double bill with the Australian film Pituri (also known as Uncivilised).

The Los Angeles Times said that "those who love their mystery and their Lugosi will find this film unusually sinister."

The film was colorized in the 1990s.

See also
Black Dragons (gang), a modern Triad organisation.
Black Dragons (subculture), a French antifascist group analogous to the Black Panthers.

References

External links

 

 
 
Review of film at Variety

1942 films
1940s spy films
American black-and-white films
1940s English-language films
Mad scientist films
American spy films
American World War II propaganda films
1940s science fiction films
Films directed by William Nigh
Monogram Pictures films